Edmund John Stack (January 31, 1874 – April 12, 1957) was a U.S. Representative from Illinois.

Born in Chicago, Illinois, Stack attended the grammar and high schools of Chicago. He was graduated from the law department of Lake Forest (Illinois) University in 1895. He was admitted to the bar the same year and commenced the practice of his profession in Chicago, Illinois. He was appointed assistant corporation counsel of Chicago and, later, chief trial attorney. He was an unsuccessful candidate for election in 1906 to the Sixtieth Congress.

Stack was elected as a Democrat to the Sixty-second Congress (March 4, 1911 - March 3, 1913). He was an unsuccessful candidate for renomination in 1912. He resumed the practice of law. He died in Chicago, Illinois, April 12, 1957. He was interred in Calvary Cemetery, Evanston, Illinois.

References

1874 births
1957 deaths
Politicians from Chicago
Democratic Party members of the United States House of Representatives from Illinois
Burials at Calvary Cemetery (Evanston, Illinois)